Nobol Canton is a canton of Ecuador, located in the Guayas Province.  Its capital is the town of Nobol.  Its population at the 2001 census was 14,753.

Demographics
Ethnic groups as of the Ecuadorian census of 2010:
Mestizo  50.4%
Montubio  38.0%
Afro-Ecuadorian  6.4%
White  4.8%
Indigenous  0.2%
Other  0.2%

References

Cantons of Guayas Province